Bactromyiella is a genus of bristle flies in the family Tachinidae.

Species
Bactromyiella ficta (Walker, 1861)

References

Diptera of Australasia
Diptera of Asia
Exoristinae
Tachinidae genera
Monotypic Brachycera genera